José Luis Ramírez (born May 8, 1979) is a NASCAR driver. He has attempted to become the fourth Mexican driver to run a Nextel Cup race after Pedro Rodríguez, Al Loquasto, and Jorge Goeters. He attempted a Nextel race in 2005 at Infineon Raceway, but he failed to qualify. He did qualify for two NASCAR Craftsman Truck Series races that season, ending up with a 36th and 29th-place finishes. He has two Busch Series starts. His first start was at the Autodromo Hermanos Rodriguez in 2005; he finishing 31st. His second start happened in 2008 when he finished 39th at the same track. He currently is a diversity driver for Team Racing.

Motorsports career results

NASCAR
(key) (Bold – Pole position awarded by qualifying time. Italics – Pole position earned by points standings or practice time. * – Most laps led.)

Nextel Cup Series

Nationwide Series

Craftsman Truck Series

References

External links
 

1979 births
Living people
Mexican racing drivers
NASCAR drivers
Racing drivers from Mexico City